Bullcoming v. New Mexico, 564 U.S. 647 (2011), is a significant 6th Amendment Confrontation Clause case decided by the United States Supreme Court. On June 23, 2011, the Supreme Court considered the issue whether a defendant's Confrontation Clause rights extend to a non-testifying laboratory analyst whose supervisor testifies as to test results that the analyst transcribed from a machine. In a five to four decision authored by Justice Ginsburg, the Court held that the second surrogate analyst could not testify about the testimonial statements in the forensic report of the certifying analyst under the Confrontation Clause.

The case follows a line of decisions, including Crawford v. Washington (2004) and Davis v. Washington (2006), that altered the Court's interpretation of the Confrontation Clause guarantee and clarified its application only to "testimonial" statements.

Background
Donald Bullcoming of New Mexico was arrested on suspicion of driving while intoxicated. He was sentenced to two years in prison for a felony aggravated DWI/DUI. At the trial, the State used a blood alcohol test that was taken under a search warrant after Bullcoming refused to take a breathalyzer test. At his trial, the prosecution presented a lab report indicating that his blood-alcohol levels were elevated. But rather than calling the technician who had prepared and signed the report, prosecutors called a colleague who had not observed or reviewed the analysis.

Issue
Whether the Confrontation Clause permits the prosecution to introduce testimonial statements of a nontestifying forensic analyst through the in-court testimony of a supervisor or other person who did not perform or observe the laboratory analysis described in the statements.

Procedural history
On February 12, 2010, the New Mexico Supreme Court issued its written decision, cited at 147 N.M. 487, 226 P.3d 1.  On March 2, 2011, the oral argument before the United States Supreme Court took place, during which Jeffrey L. Fisher argued on behalf of the Petitioner and Gary King argued on behalf of the Respondent.  The United States Supreme Court issued its written decision on June 23, 2011.

Decision of the Supreme Court

In a 5 to 4 decision in favor of Bullcoming, Justice Ginsburg wrote the majority opinion for the Court. The US Supreme Court ruled that the Sixth Amendment gives a criminal defendant the right “to be confronted with the witnesses against him,” and that “surrogate testimony” is not good enough.

See also
Melendez-Diaz v. Massachusetts (2009)

References

Further reading

External links
 
 Bullcoming v. New Mexico Resource Page  Containing background information and links to key materials on the case. 

2011 in United States case law
Confrontation Clause case law
United States Supreme Court cases
United States Supreme Court cases of the Roberts Court
Legal history of New Mexico